Lake Corpus Christi State Park is a state park located on Lake Corpus Christi in San Patricio County, Texas, United States southwest of Mathis. The state leased the land from the City of Corpus Christi in 1934 and the park was opened the same year.

History
The park was constructed by Civilian Conservation Corps (CCC) Company 886 between 1934 and 1935. CCC buildings included a bathhouse, park residence, boat house and a refectory, but only the refectory remains. Other CCC structures include a lookout tower, Park Road 25, and bridges.

Flora
The park is a mixture of brushlands, wetlands, woodlands and the open waters of Lake Corpus Christi creating a diverse ecological area.

Fauna
Common birds within the park include the black-bellied whistling duck, American purple gallinule, white-winged dove, pauraque, long-billed thrasher, white-eyed vireo, pyrrhuloxia and black-throated sparrow. Common mammals include javelina, cottontail rabbits and white-tailed deer. Popular fish include blue, channel and yellow catfish and sunfish, bass and crappie.

See also
 List of Texas state parks

References

External links

 Texas Parks and Wildlife: Lake Corpus Christi State Park

State parks of Texas
Protected areas of San Patricio County, Texas
Civilian Conservation Corps in Texas